Ira Shor (born June 2, 1945) is a professor at the College of Staten Island, City University of New York, where he teaches composition and rhetoric. He is also doctoral faculty in the PhD Program in English at The Graduate Center, CUNY.

Biography
Shor grew up in the working class area in the South Bronx of New York City. Shor has stated that coming from a working-class area had a powerful influence on his thinking, politics and feelings.

Personal life
Shor has one son, Paulo Shor, whom he named after his main influence Paulo Freire.

Theoretical Contribution 

In collaboration with Paulo Freire, he has been one of the leading exponents of critical pedagogy. Together they co-wrote A Pedagogy for Liberation.

Works
Critical Teaching and Everyday Life (1980)
Culture Wars: School and Society in the Conservative Restoration (1986)
A Pedagogy for Liberation, with Paulo Freire (1987)
Freire for the Classroom: A Sourcebook for Liberatory Teaching (1987)
Empowering Education (1992)
When Students have Power: Negotiating Authority in a Critical Pedagogy (1996)
Critical Literacy in Action (1999)
Education is Politics (1999)

References

American educational theorists
Living people
Critical pedagogy
1945 births
College of Staten Island faculty
People from the Bronx